Amalia Pérez Vázquez (born 10 July 1973) is a Mexican powerlifter in the  -  bracket. She has four times been a Paralympic champion and is the only powerlifter in the world to have Paralympic champion in three divisions.

Pérez has been a member of the Mexican delegation to the Paralympic Games since 2000. It was her participation of 2000 Summer Paralympics that won Pérez her first silver medal in the  powerlifting event, and she would again win a silver medal in the 2004 Summer Paralympics in Athens, but this time in the  event. In 2016, she won the gold medal in the women's 55 kg event at the 2016 Summer Paralympics held in Rio de Janeiro, Brazil. She also won the gold medal in the women's 61 kg event at the 2020 Summer Paralympics held in Tokyo, Japan.

At the 2011 Parapan American Games held in Guadalajara, she received the gold medal in the women's 44kg - 60kg event.

In 2008, Pérez received the National Mexican Sports Award.

In 2021, she won the gold medal in her event at the 2021 World Para Powerlifting Championships held in Tbilisi, Georgia.

References

External links
 

Living people
1977 births
Female powerlifters
Paralympic powerlifters of Mexico
Paralympic gold medalists for Mexico
Paralympic silver medalists for Mexico
Powerlifters at the 2000 Summer Paralympics
Powerlifters at the 2004 Summer Paralympics
Powerlifters at the 2008 Summer Paralympics
Powerlifters at the 2012 Summer Paralympics
Powerlifters at the 2016 Summer Paralympics
Powerlifters at the 2020 Summer Paralympics
Medalists at the 2000 Summer Paralympics
Medalists at the 2004 Summer Paralympics
Medalists at the 2008 Summer Paralympics
Medalists at the 2012 Summer Paralympics
Medalists at the 2016 Summer Paralympics
Medalists at the 2020 Summer Paralympics
Paralympic medalists in powerlifting
Medalists at the 2007 Parapan American Games
Medalists at the 2011 Parapan American Games
Medalists at the 2015 Parapan American Games
Medalists at the 2019 Parapan American Games
Sportspeople from Mexico City
20th-century Mexican women
21st-century Mexican women